This article describes the qualification for the 2023 Women's European Volleyball Championship.

Qualification
Belgium, Italy, Estonia and Germany as host countries were directly qualified. The eight best placed teams at the 2021 edition also gained direct entries into the tournament. 24 teams compete for the remaining 12 places at the final tournament.

Direct qualification
All of the hosted countries' teams directly qualified for the tournament. Then, the top eight teams from previous edition also automatically qualified.

 2021 Women's European Volleyball Championship final standing

Pools composition
The pools were set following the Serpentine system according to their European Ranking for national teams as of January 2022. Rankings are shown in brackets.

Results

Pool A

|}

|}

Pool B

|}

|}

Pool C

|}

|}

Pool D

|}

|}

Pool E

|}

}

|}

Pool F

|}

|}

Notes

References

External links

2023
2022 in women's volleyball